University Field is the on-campus soccer stadium at the University of Texas at El Paso.

The small stadium only seats 500 spectators, but room can be made for more if needed. It was built in 1996.

External links
 Information at UTEP athletics

Soccer venues in Texas
UTEP Miners
Sports venues in El Paso, Texas
1996 establishments in Texas
Sports venues completed in 1996